Anelosimus guacamayos is a species of social cobweb spider that occurs in the lower Ecuadorian sierra. The live in large nests (1–2 meters in width), and are found in disturbed areas. Like rain forest cobweb spiders, they cooperate in the capture of prey and building of a communal nest.

References

Theridiidae
Spiders described in 2006
Spiders of South America
Invertebrates of Ecuador